Tyniowice  (Tynevychi) is a village in the administrative district of Gmina Roźwienica, within Jarosław County, Subcarpathian Voivodeship, in south-eastern Poland.

The village has an approximate population of 460.

References

Tyniowice